O Furto dos 500 Milhões de Réis is a 1922 Brazilian silent crime film directed by Arturo Carrari.

The film premiered on 18 December 1922 in Rio de Janeiro.

Cast
José Fontana
Nicola Tartaglione

External links
 

1922 crime drama films
1922 films
Brazilian black-and-white films
Brazilian silent films
Films directed by Arturo Carrari
Brazilian crime drama films
Silent crime drama films